Hylarana similis is a species of true frog in the genus Hylarana. It is native to Luzon and surrounding smaller islands in the Philippines. Its natural habitats are subtropical or tropical dry forests, subtropical or tropical moist lowland forests, rivers, intermittent rivers, freshwater marshes, and intermittent freshwater marshes.
It is threatened by habitat loss.

References

similis
Amphibians of the Philippines
Endemic fauna of the Philippines
Fauna of Luzon
Amphibians described in 1873
Taxa named by Albert Günther
Taxobox binomials not recognized by IUCN